is a 1997 Japanese original video animation (OVA) produced by Animate Film and animated by Radix. It ran for four episodes and is the first OVA based on the Sakura Wars video games. The episodes were released in VHS and LaserDisc formats.

The OVA was announced as the first joint product to result from the proposed merger between Sega (owner of the Sakura Wars franchise) and Bandai (Bandai Visual's parent company). Though the merger was called off shortly afterwards, the OVA project proceeded as planned. ADV Films announced they had licensed the OVA series in North America in May 1998 at Project A-Kon 9; it was the first piece of Sakura Wars media made officially available in the region.

It depicts the formation of the Imperial Assault Troupe’s Flower Division leading up to the beginning of the original game where the player character takes command of the unit.

Theme songs
Openings

Lyricist: Ouji Hiroi / Composer: Kohei Tanaka / Arranger: Takayuki Negishi / Singers: Chisa Yokoyama & The Imperial Floral Assault Team

Endings

Lyricist: Ouji Hiroi / Composer: Kohei Tanaka / Arranger: Takayuki Negishi / Singers: Ai Orikasa
Episodes: 1-3

Lyricist: Ouji Hiroi / Composer: Kohei Tanaka / Arranger: Akifumi Tada / Singers: The Imperial Floral Assault Team
Episodes: 4

Insert Songs

Lyricist: Ouji Hiroi / Composer: Kohei Tanaka / Arranger: Akifumi Tada / Singers: Akio Suyama
Episodes: 1-2

Lyricist: Ouji Hiroi / Composer: Kohei Tanaka / Arranger: Masami Kishimura / Singers: Akio Suyama
Episodes: 2

Lyricist: Ouji Hiroi / Composer: Kohei Tanaka / Arranger: Masami Kishimura / Singers: Akio Suyama
Episodes: 3

Episodes

References

External links

Sakura Wars: The Gorgeous Blooming Cherry Blossoms at Bandai Channel 
 

1997 anime OVAs
1998 anime OVAs
Bandai Visual
ADV Films
Works based on Sakura Wars